Capri pants (also known as three quarter legs, or capris, crop pants, man-pris, clam-diggers, flood pants, jams, highwaters, or toreador pants) are pants that are longer than shorts, but are not as long as trousers. Capri pants can be a generic term for any cropped slim pants, and also used as a specific term to refer to pants that end on the ankle bone.

History
Capri pants were introduced by fashion designer Sonja de Lennart in 1948, and were popularized by her and English couturier Bunny Roger. The name of the pants is derived from the Italian isle of Capri, where they rose to popularity in the late 1950s and early 1960s. The actress Audrey Hepburn was among the first movie stars who wore capris, and the pants quickly became synonymous with her classic style. The French actress Brigitte Bardot famously wore capri pants at a time when trousers were still a new fashion for women. Marilyn Monroe always traveled with capri pants.

Capri pants were popularized in the United States in the 1960s television series, The Dick Van Dyke Show. The character Laura Petrie, the young housewife played by Mary Tyler Moore, caused a fashion sensation – and some mild controversy – by wearing close-fitting capri pants throughout the show's run (Capris that were later referred to as 1950s hausfrau).

By the mid 1960s, Capri-style tight-fitting cargo pants became popular among teenage boys; a good example was the superstar teen actor of that era, Luke Halpin, who wore them in some episodes of the popular Flipper. After a drop in popularity during the 1970s through the 1990s, capri paints returned to favor in the mid 2000s. Spanish tennis player Rafael Nadal wore capri pants in the majority of his matches before 2009 following a deal with Nike to wear sponsored capris, a deal that Roger Federer had turned down before him. Jodie Whittaker wore Capri Pants when she appeared on Doctor Who. Kate Middleton wore capri pants for outdoorsy events.

In 2017, the superintendent of the Douglas County School District in Georgia sent out an email qualifying capri pants as inappropriate garments for the school environment, thus raising the question of what pants length remain acceptable.

Gallery

See also
 Clothing
 Culottes
 Fashion
 Knickerbockers
 Pedal pushers

References

External links

1960s fashion
1970s fashion
2000s fashion
History of fashion
Trousers and shorts